The Voice Kids is a version of The Voice TV series franchise in which children participate.

Versions
The first such variation was The Voice Kids from the Netherlands, which was followed by other international variants:
 Franchise with a currently airing season
 Franchise with an upcoming season
 Franchise with an unknown status
 Franchise that had ceased to air
 Franchise that was cancelled during production
 Original version (Netherlands)

Alumni
Some of the singers who have participated in The Voice Kids have also participated in the Junior Eurovision Song Contest, a junior version of the Eurovision Song Contest. They include:

 Darina Krasnovetska (Ukraine)
 Daneliya Tuleshova (Kazakhstan but competed in The Voice Kids Ukraine, winner)
 Max Albertazzi (Netherlands)
 Anne Buhre (Netherlands)
 Alisa Kozhikina (Russia, winner)
 Angélina Nava (France, winner)
 Roksana Węgiel (Poland, winner) 
 Helena Meraai (Belarus but competed in The Voice Kids Russia)
 Anastasiya Baginska (Ukraine)
 Anna Trincher (Ukraine)
 Polina Bogusevich (Russia)
 Sofia Fisenko (Russia)
 Alexander Minyonok (Belarus but competed in The Voice Kids Ukraine)
 Alexa Curtis (Australia, winner)
 Zena Donnelly (Ireland but competed in The Voice Kids UK)
 Bella Paige (Australia)
 Ana Kodra (Albania)
 Melani García (Spain, winner)
 Karina Ignatyan (Armenia but competed in The Voice Kids Russia)
 Sophia Ivanko (Ukraine)
 Carla Lazzari (France)
 Wiktoria Gabor (Poland)
 Yerzhan Maksim (Kazakhstan but competed in The Voice Kids Russia)
 Daniel Yastremski (Belarus but competed in The Voice Kids Russia)
 Lizavieta Misnikova (Belarus but competed in The Voice Kids Poland)
 Isea Çili (Albania)
 Naomi Traa (The Netherlands)
 Maud Noordam (The Netherlands)
 Alicja Tracz (Poland)
 Valentina Tronel (France)
 Susan Oseloff (Germany)
 Sofia Feskova (Russia)
 Arina Pehtereva (Belarus but competed in The Voice Kids Ukraine and The Voice Kids Russia)
 Olena Usenko (Ukraine)
 Sara James (Poland, winner)
 Simão Oliveira (Portugal, winner)
 Sona Azizova (Azerbaijan)
 Levi Díaz (Spain, winner)
 Nicolas Alves (Portugal)
 Laura Bączkiewicz (Poland)
 Carlos Higes (Spain)

See also
 The Voice (franchise)
 List of The Voice Senior TV series

References

External links
 Talpa Media's Official website
 The Voice Kids on Talpa

Voice Kids
Voice Kids